The Konkordia Hut (German: Konkordiahütte) is a mountain hut of the Swiss Alpine Club, located north of Fieschertal in the canton of Valais. The hut lies above Konkordiaplatz, the point of convergence of several glaciers in the great Aletsch Glacier system of the Bernese Alps. It is located at a height of 2,850 metres above sea level, at the foot of the Fülbärg.

Access 
Because of its location, the hut is long way from villages (6 hours from Fiescheralp, 10 hours from Fafleralp). The shortest way starts at the Jungfraujoch railway station (4 hours). All access routes are via the Aletsch Glacier. The hut lies approximately 150 metres above the level of the ice.
The hut can be reached by stairs or via an unsecured steep path from the level of ice.

References
Swisstopo topographic maps

External links 
 
The Konkordia Hut on Mount Wiki

Mountain huts in Switzerland
Mountain huts in the Alps